Don't Shoot is a 1922 American silent crime film directed by Jack Conway and starring Herbert Rawlinson, Edna Murphy and Harvey Clark.

Cast
 Herbert Rawlinson as James Harrington Court 
 William Dyer as Boss McGinnis 
 Harvey Clark as Honest John Lysaght 
 Wade Boteler as Buck Lindsay 
 Margaret Campbell as Mrs. Van Deek 
 Edna Murphy as Velma Gay 
 George Fisher as Archie Craig 
 Tiny Sandford as Jim 
 Duke R. Lee as Pete 
 Gerard Alexander as Mrs. Ransom 
 Fred Kelsey as Police Officer 
 L.J. O'Connor as Larry the Dip

References

Bibliography
 Langman, Larry. American Film Cycles: The Silent Era. Greenwood Publishing, 1998.

External links

1922 films
1922 crime films
American crime films
Films directed by Jack Conway
American silent feature films
1920s English-language films
Universal Pictures films
American black-and-white films
1920s American films